Chen Guiming (born 3 January 1994) is a Chinese weightlifter.

She participated at the 2018 World Weightlifting Championships, winning a medal.

References

External links

1994 births
Living people
Chinese female weightlifters
World Weightlifting Championships medalists
21st-century Chinese women